The Las Vacas Dam is a reinforced concrete gravity dam and power plant spanning the Las Vacas River near the village of San Antonio Las Flores in the municipality Chinautla, Guatemala.

The hydroelectric power plant is designed as a peaking plant and the water stored in its 258,969 m³ reservoir is used to generate electricity during hours of peak demand. It has 5 Pelton turbines with a total installed capacity of 45 MWe which generate an average of 120 GWh of electricity per year.

The plant includes facilities for collecting and recycling plastic waste material found in the reservoir.

The Las Vacas project was built by a conglomerate of 4 private sector companies: Cementos Progreso, Fabrigas, Comegsa, and Iberdrola, which are partners in Hidroeléctrica Río Las Vacas, S.A.

See also

 List of hydroelectric power stations in Guatemala
Hydroelectricity

References

External links
Official website

Hydroelectric power stations in Guatemala
Energy infrastructure completed in 2003
Dams completed in 2002
Dams in Guatemala
2002 establishments in Guatemala